Stephen Michael Swartz (born December 13, 1991) is an American electronic music artist, singer-songwriter, and producer. He is known for his song "Crossfire" and his cover of Adele's song "Hello". He collaborated with Pell and Caleborate in the song "In the Morning".

Stephen's debut album, Sincerely, was released on May 10, 2016. His sophomore album, Akrasia, was released on August 21, 2020.

Discography

Albums

Extended plays

Singles

References

External links
 

1991 births
Living people
American electronic musicians
Monstercat artists
People from Vienna, Virginia